Moog is an American-based designer and manufacturer of electric, electro-hydraulic and hydraulic motion, controls and systems for applications in aerospace, defense, industrial and medical devices. The company operates under four segments: aircraft controls, space and defense controls, industrial controls, and components. Moog is headquartered in Elma, New York and has sales, engineering, and manufacturing facilities in twenty-six countries.

History

Bill Moog
In April 1950 Bill Moog (cousin of Robert Moog, inventor of the Moog synthesizer) applied for a patent for the electrohydraulic servo valve (later called a "Moog Valve"), a device to control hydraulic pressure for fine control of actuators. The US patent 2625136 was issued in January 1953. Bill Moog died in 1997 aged 82.

Notable projects
Moog provided products and technologies that were used on the B-2 Bomber and were also responsible for the flight control actuation system. Moog also contributed to the manufacture and development of both hydraulic and electric flight simulators. Moog's design was adapted to form the Spider-Man ride at Universal Studios adventure theme park. Moog also worked on several space contracts and designed part of the liquid rocket engine propulsion systems on the Voyager space probes and provided thruster valves that steered the spacecraft. Moog also made servo-actuators for four Space Shuttles.

Moog provided a control and motion system for the Wimbledon Centre Court retracting roof. This consisted of about 150 axes of AC servo-controlled electric actuators, AC servomotors, AC servodrives and the complete motion control system, including software. It was engineered by Moog's UK facility and enabled the Centre Court's only night-time tennis performance. Moog also provided a similar system for the No1 Court at Wimbledon.

Moog initiated an effort along with other aerospace suppliers to explore the application of blockchain technology in their supply chain. They developed the Moog VeriPart blockchain to track parts through the design, manufacturing, and service process. They have partnered with Aion Network in developing their blockchain.

In 2018, Moog and the University at Buffalo announced a project to use machine learning algorithms to differentiate acceptable from non-conforming areas of metal parts produced using additive manufacturing techniques. Areas considered improperly welded are identified from images evaluated by a convolutional neural network.

Moog also has notable track record of providing a range of control axes on Formula 1 racing cars and has been involved in this business for over 30 years. The technologies provide extremely high power:weight ratio and provide actuation for up to 10 axes on each car.

In 2019, Moog acquired the SureFly electric vertical takeoff and landing aircraft along with its related hybrid electric power system technology from Workhorse Group Inc. The acquisition was driven by an interest in electric power systems and was a step towards developing electric aircraft technology.

Aircraft controls

The company's largest segment is aircraft controls which generates revenues from military and commercial aircraft in addition to aftermarket support.

Embraer E-Jet E2 family Flight Control Computers and Primary Flight Control System

Airbus A350 Primary and Secondary Flight Control Systems and Components

Boeing 787 Primary Flight Control System

A400M Primary Flight Controls

F-35 Primary Flight Controls

Space and defense
Moog has technologies for satellites and space vehicles in addition to various aspects of defense such as missiles, weapons / stores management, turreted weapon systems, naval technologies along with security and surveillance systems. One weapons system is the Reconfigurable Integrated-weapons Platform (RIwP) which is to form part of the Stryker vehicle sold by General Dynamics Land Systems to the US Army.

For satellites, Moog develops chemical and electric propulsion systems and space flight motion controls.  Various launch vehicles and missiles use Moog's steering and propulsion controls, and the International Space Station uses its couplings, valves and actuators.

Moog has both Electro-Hydraulic and Electro-Mechanical systems as part of its solutions.

In 2012, Moog acquired the In-Space Propulsion (ISP) business of American Pacific Corporation (AMPAC), which was formerly part of Atlantic Research Corporation (ARC). Products include the LEROS family of liquid-propellant thrusters, acquired by ARC in 1998 and developed in the 1990s by Royal Ordnance (later part of British Aerospace) in the United Kingdom; Moog operated a manufacturing facility at Westcott, Buckinghamshire on the former Royal Ordnance site, until 2017 when the ISP business was acquired by Nammo.

Moog has supplied assistance on the following:
 United Launch Alliance
 Atlas V components.
 Boeing SST systems and components
 Swing-wing components.
 Apollo mission systems and components.
 Space Shuttle systems and components.
 International Space Station systems and components.
 Deep Space 1 systems, components, and consultation.
 Ion thruster systems, components, and consultation.
 Gravity Probe B systems and components.
 Liquid Helium management components.
 Orbital ATK systems and components.
 Boeing SLS systems and components.
 Artemis 1 components.

Industrial
Moog provides industrial services. For the plastics and machinery market Moog designs, manufactures and integrates systems for all axes of injection and blow molding machines using both hydraulic and electric technology. In the power generation turbine market, Moog designs, manufactures and integrates control assemblies for fuel, steam and variable geometry control applications that include wind turbines. Metal forming markets use Moog designed and manufactured systems that provide control of position, velocity, force and other parameters. Heavy industry uses Moog's electrical and hydraulic servovalves for steel and aluminum mill equipment. For the material test markets, Moog supplies controls for automotive, structural and fatigue testing. The company's hydraulic and electromechanical motion simulation bases are used for the flight simulation and training markets. Other markets include material handling and testing, motorsport (including F1), carpet tufting, paper and lumber mills.

Components
Moog markets medical equipment components. As a result of the acquisition of the Power and Data Technologies Group of the Kaydon Corporation in July 2005, Moog entered into the market of marine applications.  Components has several other product lines that include the design and manufacture of electromechanical actuators, fiber optic modems, avionic instrumentation, optical switches and resolvers.

In 2019, Moog introduced a new project that intend to use a unique model based on block-chain and 3D printer to produce airplane parts, on demand.

Medical devices
Medical devices is Moog's newest segment, formed as a result of the acquisition of Curlin Medical, McKinley Medical, and Zevex International in 2006. Moog's primary products are electronic ambulatory infusion pumps and ambulatory enteral feeding pumps along with the necessary administration sets as well as disposable infusion pumps.  Applications of these products include controlled delivery of fluids to the body, nutrition, post-operative pain management, regional anesthesia, chemotherapy and antibiotics.  On January 23, 2009 Moog acquired the stock of Ethox International for $15.2 million in cash. Ethox is a Buffalo, NY based medical products manufacturer and service provider.

On July 1, 2013, Moog announced the sale of its Buffalo, New York operations of Ethox Medical to Dempsey Ventures. Annual sales from this division were approximately $12 million, with 88 full-time employees. Dempsey Ventures, based in Grand Rapids, Michigan, is a private equity firm focused on healthcare products. Its portfolio of companies in the anesthesia/respiratory space includes SunMed, Bay Medical and Ventlab. The Company also announced that it has engaged RBC Capital Markets LLC to assist with the strategic assessment of the remainder of its Medical Devices segment, including the possibility of divesting the entire segment.

In 2016 the remainder of Moog's medical devices segment was integrated into the components group.

Navigation aids
Moog Navigation and Surveillance Systems (NaSS) was established in 1955 and registered its first Tactical Air Navigation (TACAN) patents in 1962. That was the beginning of a long TACAN history. Since that time, Moog has designed and manufactured TACAN systems for use by militaries around the world including systems for fixed site, shipboard, mobile and man portable applications.

In 2009, Moog added engineering expertise as well as Distance Measuring Equipment (DME) and Direction Finding (DF) products through the acquisition of Fernau Avionics, Ltd.

Today, Moog NaSS continues to expand product offerings through internal research and development as well as licensing and strategic relationships and can now offer a full range of navigation aids including VHF Omnidirectional Range (VOR) and Instrument Landing System (ILS) equipment.

References

Companies based in Buffalo, New York
Companies listed on the New York Stock Exchange
Defense companies of the United States
Flight control system manufacturers
Technology companies of the United States